Mohamed Karlakwan Damala Bamba (born May 12, 1998) is an American professional basketball player for the Los Angeles Lakers of the National Basketball Association (NBA). He played college basketball for the Texas Longhorns. He was highly regarded by scouts due to his  wingspan. He attended Cardigan Mountain School in Canaan, New Hampshire and Westtown School in West Chester, Pennsylvania and was considered one of the top high school prospects for the class of 2017.

Early life
Bamba was born on May 12, 1998 in Harlem, New York to Lancine Bamba and Aminata Johnson, who both emigrated from the Ivory Coast. Bamba's grandparents were born and brought up in Mali. His older brother, Sidiki Johnson, played college basketball at Arizona, Providence, and Wabash Valley. Another member of his family, estranged brother Ibrahim Johnson, also played college basketball at multiple universities, including both Farmingdale State and Montevallo. Bamba first became interested in basketball at age six, inspired by the game's popularity in his hometown.

High school career

In eighth and ninth grade, Bamba attended Cardigan Mountain School, an all-boys boarding school in Canaan, New Hampshire.

After graduating from Cardigan, Bamba went on to Westtown School in Westtown, Pennsylvania. As a junior he averaged 14 points, 11 rebounds, and six blocks per game. He played in the 2017 McDonald's All American Game and the Nike Hoop Summit.

Bamba was rated as a five-star recruit and was ranked among the top recruits in his class. His final four schools were Kentucky, Duke, Texas and Michigan. Ultimately, Bamba chose to play for the University of Texas for his college career. Before playing a single game for Texas, his half-brother Ibrahim Johnson posted a 22-minute-long video on Facebook Live, talking about how there were some illegal benefits from a Michigan-based investor involved during the decision-making and that he was reporting the information to the NCAA. However, the NCAA reported that nothing involved there would ultimately affect Bamba's eligibility for his freshman season.

College career
Bamba made his official college debut on November 10, 2017 against Northwestern State, recording 15 points and eight rebounds in a blowout win that night. Eight days later, he recorded 13 points, 10 rebounds, and five blocks in a blowout win against Lipscomb. On December 30, Bamba recorded a season-high 22 points, 15 rebounds, and eight blocks in a loss to Kansas. On New Year's Day 2018, Bamba would record a then-season-high 16 rebounds with 10 points in a 74–70 overtime win over Iowa State. He would record a new career-high in points scored with 25 points scored with 15 rebounds in an 85–72 win over Ole Miss on January 27, 2018, five days after recording his previous high of 24 points in a win over Iowa State. On February 17, Bamba would record a new career-high of 18 rebounds with 10 points scored in a 77–66 win over #23 ranked Oklahoma, five days after tying his previous career-high of 16 rebounds with 16 points in a close 74–73 double overtime loss to Baylor. At the end of the regular season for Texas, Bamba was named a member of the Big 12's All-Newcomer Team and All-Defensive Team, as well as be named a member of the All-Big 12 Second Team. He averaged 12.9 points, 10.5 rebounds, and 0.5 assists per game.

Following Texas's loss in the 2018 NCAA men's basketball tournament to Nevada, Bamba announced his intention to forgo his final three seasons of collegiate eligibility and declare for the 2018 NBA draft, where he was expected to be a lottery selection.

Professional career
At a private workout, Bamba reportedly ran faster than most of the NBA, including MVP Russell Westbrook, since he had a 3.04 3/4 court sprint. Bamba refused to work out with the Memphis Grizzlies before the draft, and told them not to draft him.

Orlando Magic (2018–2023)
On June 21, 2018, Bamba was selected with the sixth overall pick by the Orlando Magic in the 2018 NBA draft. On July 3, 2018, Bamba officially signed a rookie-scale contract with the Magic. He made his professional debut on October 17, 2018, recording 13 points, seven rebounds, and two blocks off the bench in a 104–101 win over the Miami Heat.

On May 3, 2021, Bamba scored 22 points and grabbed a then-career-high 15 rebounds in 29 minutes off the bench in a 119–112 win over the Detroit Pistons.

On October 29, 2021, Bamba grabbed a career-high 18 rebounds and scored 14 points during a 110–109 loss to the Toronto Raptors. On January 19, 2022, Bamba scored a career-high 32 points on seven three-pointers made in a 123–110 loss to the Philadelphia 76ers.

On July 1, 2022, Bamba re-signed with the Magic on a two-year deal. On December 29, he was suspended by the NBA for one game without pay due to coming off the bench during an altercation in a game against the Detroit Pistons the day before. On February 4, 2023, Bamba was suspended by the NBA for four games without pay due to his role in an altercation during a game against the Minnesota Timberwolves the day before. During the altercation, Bamba left the Magic bench area and threw punches at Timberwolves guard Austin Rivers.

Los Angeles Lakers (2023–present) 
On February 9, 2023, Bamba was traded to the Los Angeles Lakers in a four-team trade involving the Los Angeles Clippers and Denver Nuggets. On March 5, during a 113–105 win over the Golden State Warriors, he played two minutes before suffering a left ankle injury and leaving the game. Four days later, the Lakers announced that Bamba had been diagnosed with a high left ankle sprain and would be sidelined for at least four weeks, ending his regular season run.

Career statistics

NBA

Regular season

|-
| style="text-align:left;"|
| style="text-align:left;"|Orlando
| 47 || 1 || 16.3 || .481 || .300 || .587 || 5.0 || .8 || .3 || 1.4 || 6.2
|-
| style="text-align:left;"|
| style="text-align:left;"|Orlando
| 62 || 0 || 14.2 || .462 || .346 || .674 || 4.9 || .7 || .4 || 1.4 || 5.4
|-
| style="text-align:left;"|
| style="text-align:left;"|Orlando
| 46 || 5 || 15.8 || .472 || .322 || .682 || 5.8 || .8 || .3 || 1.3 || 8.0
|-
| style="text-align:left;"|
| style="text-align:left;"|Orlando
| 71 || 69 || 25.7 || .480 || .381 || .781 || 8.1 || 1.2 || .5 || 1.7 || 10.6
|-
| style="text-align:left;"|
| style="text-align:left;"|Orlando
| 40 || 6 || 17.0 || .495 || .398 || .686 || 4.6 || 1.1 || .3 || 1.0 || 7.3
|-
| style="text-align:left;"|
| style="text-align:left;"|L.A. Lakers
| 7 || 1 || 11.6 || .417 || .333 || .545 || 5.3 || .6 || .1 || .6 || 4.4
|- class="sortbottom"
| style="text-align:center;" colspan="2"|Career
| 273 || 82 || 18.2 || .477 || .359 || .681 || 5.8 || .9 || .4 || 1.3 || 7.6

College

|-
| style="text-align:left;"|2017–18
| style="text-align:left;"|Texas
| 29 || 28 || 30.2 || .603 || .280 || .678 || 10.4 || .5 || .8 || 3.7 || 12.9

Personal life
During his time growing up in Harlem, Bamba was friends with rapper Sheck Wes. Their relationship would eventually inspire the hit single "Mo Bamba".

References

External links

 Texas Longhorns bio

1998 births
Living people
21st-century African-American sportspeople
African-American basketball players
American men's basketball players
American people of Ivorian descent
Sportspeople of Ivorian descent
American people of Malian descent
Sportspeople of Malian descent
Basketball players from New York City
Centers (basketball)
McDonald's High School All-Americans
Orlando Magic draft picks
Orlando Magic players
People from Harlem
Power forwards (basketball)
Sportspeople from Manhattan
Texas Longhorns men's basketball players
Westtown School alumni